Andrew J. Musser Jr. (December 28, 1937 – January 22, 2012) was an American sportscaster. He is best known for his time as a play-by-play announcer for Philadelphia Phillies baseball from 1976 to 2001.

Early life and education
Born in Lemoyne, Pennsylvania he grew up in nearby Harrisburg. He received a Bachelor of Arts in communications from Syracuse University in 1959.

Career
Musser, Richie Ashburn, and  Harry Kalas were a team which broadcast Phillies games on both radio and television for 21 consecutive seasons from 1976 to 1997. He retired after the 2001 season.

Musser worked for WCAU radio and television in Philadelphia from 1965 to 1971. During this time he served as a radio play-by-play announcer for Eagles football as well as 76ers and Villanova Wildcats basketball. One of the youngest lead broadcasters in the National Football League at the time, he covered the Eagles' games with Charlie Gauer for four years until the station lost the broadcast rights to WIP in 1969. Musser also called various events nationally for CBS Radio, including Super Bowl VI, Super Bowl VIII and the 1976 MLB All-Star Game.

Musser was the lead voice for Chicago Bulls telecasts on WSNS from 1973 through 1976, pairing with Dick Gonski in the first two seasons and Lorn Brown in the third. Musser called New York Knicks away games with Cal Ramsey on WOR-TV and Manhattan Cable Television home games for the next four seasons from 1976 to 1980. He handled all the games in the first three years, but only home games in the fourth year.

The Broadcast Pioneers of Philadelphia inducted Musser into their Hall of Fame in November 2011.

Personal life
Musser was married for 50 years to Eun Joo. They had two children, Allan and Luanne, and four grandchildren. Musser died on January 22, 2012.

Memorable calls

References

1937 births
2012 deaths
American radio sports announcers
American television sports announcers
Chicago Bulls announcers
College basketball announcers in the United States
College football announcers
Major League Baseball broadcasters
National Basketball Association broadcasters
National Football League announcers
New York Knicks announcers
NFL Films people
People from Harrisburg, Pennsylvania
Philadelphia 76ers announcers
Philadelphia Eagles announcers
Philadelphia Phillies announcers
S.I. Newhouse School of Public Communications alumni
Major Indoor Soccer League (1978–1992) commentators